Jacob Hustaert was a Governor of Dutch Ceylon during the Dutch period in Ceylon. He was the son of Pieter Hustaert from Antwerp and Elisabeth Moucheron from Middelburg. In 1645 he was stationed on the Moluccas and became the governor of Ambon; in 1662 of the Coromandel. He was appointed on 27 December 1663, and was governor of Ceylon until 19 November 1664. He was succeeded by Rijckloff van Goens.

Footnotes 

17th-century Dutch colonial governors
Governors of Dutch Ceylon